Skövde Arena is a building for rehabilitation, fitness, gym, massage and public events in Skövde, Sweden. It has a capacity for 2,400 spectators during sport events.

External links 

Nya Arena Skövde

Indoor arenas in Sweden
Handball venues in Sweden
Sport in Skövde
Buildings and structures in Västra Götaland County